Eyn or EYN may refer to:
 Church of the Brethren in Nigeria
 Eynsford railway station, in England
 River Ainse (or Eyn), in England
 Ayin, the sixteenth letter of the Semitic abjads
 Eyn, an American experimental rock musician